Image Nation, formerly known as Imagenation Abu Dhabi, is an Emirati film production and media company that acts as a subsidiary of the governmental Media Zone Authority Abu Dhabi (MZA), which in turn is based at twofour54 in Abu Dhabi, the United Arab Emirates. It was founded in 2007 as a platform for development of regional talent and productions and has two divisions, Image Nation Abu Dhabi and Image Nation International for co-production of international films etc., and a joint venture, Parkes + MacDonald Image Nation (or simply P+M Image Nation). The company was renamed Image Nation in October 2011, formed those two divisions, and is led by Mohamed Al Mubarak, Chairman of the Board for Image Nation, and Michael Garin, Chief Executive Officer.

Filmography

Movies

Amreeka (2009)
Shorts (2009)
My Name Is Khan (2010)
The Crazies (2010)
Furry Vengeance (2010)
Fair Game (2010)
The Way Back (2010)
The Beaver (2011)
The Help (2011)
Contagion (2011)
Sea Shadow (2011)
The Double (2011)
The Best Exotic Marigold Hotel (2011)
Ghost Rider: Spirit of Vengeance (2011)
Men in Black 3 (2012)
Djinn (2012)
Promised Land (2012)
Snitch (2013)
The Hundred-Foot Journey (2014)
Life of Crime (2014)
A Most Violent Year (2014)
Keeping Up with the Joneses (2016)
Rings (2017)
The Circle (2017)
Roman J. Israel, Esq. (2017)
Men in Black: International (2019)
Prey (2019)
Mosul (2019)
Motorcade  (TBA)
Watcher (2022)

Documentaries

 Every Last Child (2014)
 As One: The Autism Project (2014)
 He Named Me Malala (2015)

Gaming

The Lord of the Rings: Aragorn's Quest (2010)
Super Scribblenauts (2010)
F.E.A.R. 3 (2011)
Harry Potter for Kinect (2012)
Scribblenauts Unlimited (2012)
Scribblenauts Remix (2013)
Injustice: Gods Among Us (2013)
Scribblenauts Unmasked: A DC Comics Adventure (2013)

References

External links
Image Nation Abu Dhabi's homepage 

Film production companies of the United Arab Emirates
2007 establishments in the United Arab Emirates